Bašić is a South Slavic surname.

It is assumed that it derived from the word baša, meaning "chief", itself a loanword from Turkish başı, meaning "head". Its literal meaning is "Little chief".

It is one of the most common surnames in two Dalmatian counties of Croatia.

Family crest 
"In a blue background on a green ground, a warrior dressed in red with high black boots and a hat, left-handed sideways with gold with a belt to which black covers are fastened. In his raised right he holds a scimitar with a golden cross opposite the neck of a kneeling bearded Turk dressed in a rainbow white kaftan with a belt, which with raised hands begs for mercy."

This description from the book is describing the conflicts that the Bassich family of Austria had against the Turks while defending Vienna.

Notable people

Film and theater

Actors/Actresses
 Ivana Bašić
Relja Bašić
Senad Bašić

Architects
Nikola Bašić

Arts
 Ivana Bašić

Music

Classical
Elly Bašić
Jasmin Bašić
Mladen Bašić

Science
Nino Bašić, mathematician

Sports
Andrija Bašić, water polo player
Alen Bašić, football player
Edin Bašić, handball player
Ivan Bašić, football player
Karlo Bašić, sailor
Josip Bašić, football player
Lovre Bašić, basketball player
Luka Bašič, ice hockey player
Marko Bašić (footballer, born 1984)
Marko Bašić (footballer, born 1988)
Mirko Bašić, handball player
Mirza Bašić, tennis player
Nermin Bašić, football manager
Sonja Bašić, handball player
Toma Bašić, football player
Tomislav Bašić, football player
Tomislav Bašić, sailor
Tonči Bašić, football player
Zlatko Bašić, football player and coach

Politics 

 Đorđe Bašić, Serbian politician

Other 

 Azra Bašić née Alešević, camp guard during Bosnian War

See also

Buljubašić
Delibašić
Harambašić
Mehmedbašić

References

Bosnian surnames
Croatian surnames
Montenegrin surnames
Serbian surnames
Patronymic surnames